Galactosyl-N-acetylglucosaminylgalactosylglucosyl-ceramide beta-1,6-N-acetylglucosaminyltransferase (uridine diphosphoacetylglucosamine-acetyllactosaminide beta1->6-acetylglucosaminyltransferase, UDP-N-acetyl-D-glucosamine:D-galactosyl-1,4-N-acetyl-beta-D-glucosaminyl-1,3-beta-D-galactosyl-1,4-beta-D-glucosylceramide beta-1,6-N-acetylglucosaminyltransferase) is an enzyme with systematic name UDP-N-acetyl-D-glucosamine:D-galactosyl-(1->4)-N-acetyl-beta-D-glucosaminyl-(1->3)-beta-D-galactosyl-(1->4)-beta-D-glucosyl-(1<->1)-ceramide 6-beta-N-acetylglucosaminyltransferase. This enzyme catalyses the following chemical reaction

 UDP-N-acetyl-D-glucosamine + D-galactosyl-(1->4)-N-acetyl-beta-D-glucosaminyl-(1->3)-beta-D-galactosyl-(1->4)-beta-D-glucosyl-(1<->1)-ceramide  UDP + N-acetyl-D-glucosaminyl-(1->6)-beta-D-galactosyl-(1->4)-N-acetyl-beta-D-glucosaminyl-(1->3)-beta-D-galactosyl-(1->4)-beta-D-glucosyl-(1<->1)-ceramide

This enzyme requires Mn2+.

References

External links 
 

EC 2.4.1